Fred M. Winner (April 8, 1912 – January 22, 2003) was a United States district judge of the United States District Court for the District of Colorado.

Education and career

Born in Denver, Colorado, Winner received a Bachelor of Arts degree and a Bachelor of Science degree from the University of Colorado Boulder in 1933, and a Bachelor of Laws from the University of Colorado Law School in 1936. He was in private practice in Denver from 1936 to 1970, interrupted by service in the United States Navy during World War II, from 1942 to 1945.

Federal judicial service

On December 8, 1970, Winner was nominated by President Richard Nixon to a new seat on the United States District Court for the District of Colorado created by 84 Stat. 294. He was confirmed by the United States Senate on December 16, 1970, and received his commission on December 18, 1970. He served as Chief Judge from 1976 to 1982, assuming senior status on April 8, 1982. Winner served in that capacity until his retirement from the bench, on August 1, 1984.

Death

Winner died on January 22, 2003, in Grand Junction, Colorado.

References

Sources
 

1912 births
2003 deaths
Judges of the United States District Court for the District of Colorado
United States district court judges appointed by Richard Nixon
20th-century American judges
United States Navy personnel of World War II